Aquinas College is one of the Residential Colleges of the University of Otago, named after St. Thomas Aquinas, located in the suburb of Dalmore. Formerly a Roman Catholic institution in the care of the Dominican order from the 1950s, the college was bought by the University in 1988 and was run for a time under the name Dalmore House, with the original name later restored.

Aquinas College maintains much of the 1950s architecture, but recently there have been major facility upgrades. The College currently houses 152 University students, making it one of the smaller University of Otago Residential Colleges.  Notable among its facilities is its gymnasium, being the only college to have an indoor basketball court.

Notable residents

References

External links
Official website.

Buildings and structures of the University of Otago
1950s architecture in New Zealand